Book of Knowledge is a topical children's encyclopedia first published in 1912.

Book of Knowledge may also refer to:

Book of Knowledge of All Kingdoms a 14th-century Catalan armorial
The New Book of Knowledge, successor to the Book of Knowledge, an alphabetic encyclopedia first published in 1966
Cassell's Book of Knowledge
 One of the later editions of the Harmsworth's Universal Encyclopaedia
 The Knowledge: How to Rebuild Our World from Scratch, a non-fiction book by Lewis Dartnell

See also 
The Children's Encyclopædia which was the originator of the 1912 encyclopedia

Disambiguation pages